Sureshbhau Dagadu Khade is an Indian politician. He is incumbent Cabinet Minister in Government of Maharashtra in Eknath Shinde ministry. He is Labour Minister of Maharashtra and Guardian Minister of Sangli district. He was elected to the Maharashtra Legislative Assembly from Miraj, Maharashtra in the 2019 Maharashtra Legislative Assembly election as a member of the Bharatiya Janata Party. He is four term member of Maharashtra Legislative Assembly. He was Minister of Social Justice in Devendra Fadnavis cabinet.

References

Living people
State cabinet ministers of Maharashtra
People from Miraj
1958 births
Marathi politicians
Members of the Maharashtra Legislative Assembly
Bharatiya Janata Party politicians from Maharashtra